Jan Jönsson (born 24 May 1960) is a Swedish football manager and former player.

Career

Playing career
He spent most of his playing career with Halmstads BK.

Coaching career
Between 1993 and 1994 he was the Sanfrecce Hiroshima assistant coach with Stuart Baxter as manager.

After retiring, he was appointed manager for Landskrona, which he took to Allsvenskan, the Swedish top flight. In 2005, he took over Norwegian club Stabæk and led them to promotion in his first season. He won the league with Stabæk in 2008.
On 19 November 2014 it was announced that Jan was moving home to Halmstad and had signed a 3-year contract as head coach of HBK. His first season in charge ended with relegation from Allsvenskan. The following season Halmstad finished third in Superettan and faced Helsingborg in a two-legged play-off, which Halmstad won 3–2 on aggregate. 

In June 2019, he returned to Stabæk for his second spell as head coach at the club. A main reason was his daughter Zara signing for Stabæk's women's team. On 25 October 2019, Stabæk announced that their contract with Jönsson had been extended till the end of the 2022 season. On 4 July 2021, Jönsson's contract with Stabæk was terminated by mutual consent.

Club statistics

Managerial honours

Club
Sanfrecce Hiroshima
 J1 League: 1st Stage Champions 1994

Landskrona BoIS
 Superettan: Runners-up 2001

Stabæk Fotball
 Tippeligaen: 2008
 1. divisjon: 2005

Halmstads BK
 Allsvenskan play-offs: Winner 2016

Individual
 Norwegian Football Manager of the Month: July 2006

References

External links

 
 

1960 births
Living people
Swedish football managers
Swedish footballers
Swedish expatriate footballers
Expatriate footballers in Japan
Halmstads BK players
Allsvenskan players
J1 League players
Japan Football League (1992–1998) players
Sanfrecce Hiroshima players
Vissel Kobe players
Landskrona BoIS managers
Ljungskile SK managers
Halmstads BK managers
Swedish expatriate football managers
Swedish expatriate sportspeople in Norway
Expatriate football managers in Norway
Expatriate football managers in Japan
Swedish expatriate sportspeople in Japan
Stabæk Fotball managers
Rosenborg BK managers
Aalesunds FK managers
Sanfrecce Hiroshima managers
Shimizu S-Pulse managers
Eliteserien managers
J1 League managers
Association football midfielders